A nocturnal house, sometimes called a nocturama, is a building in a zoo or research establishment where nocturnal animals are kept and viewable by the public. The unique feature of buildings of this type is that the lighting within is isolated from the outside and reversed; i.e. it is dark during the day and lit at night. This is to enable visitors and researchers to more conveniently study nocturnal animals during daylight hours.

Internally, a building usually consists of several glass-walled enclosures containing a replica of the animals' normal environments. In the case of burrowing animals, often their tunnels are 'half-glassed' so the animals can be observed while underground.

Notable nocturnal houses

Current

USA 

 Kingdoms of The Night, Omaha's Henry Doorly Zoo & Aquarium (Nebraska)
 The Roadhouse, Columbus Zoo & Aquarium (Ohio)
 Animals of The Night, Memphis Zoo (Tennessee)
 Bat House in Jaguar Jungle, Audubon Zoo (Louisiana)
 Brazos by Night, Cameron Park Zoo (Texas)
 Mouse House, Bronx Zoo (New York)
 Desert's Edge and Clouded leopard Rain Forest, Brookfield Zoo (Illinois)
 Night Hunters Cincinnati Zoo and Botanical Gardens(Ohio)

Mexico 

 Guadalajara Zoo

United Kingdom 

 Nightlife, ZSL London Zoo
 Fruit Bat Forest, Chester Zoo

Europe 

 Berlin Zoological Garden
 Frankfurt Zoological Garden
 Moscow Zoo
 Prague Zoo
 Plzen Zoo
 Budapest Zoological and Botanical Garden

Australasia 

 Taronga Zoo
 Wild Life Sydney
 Adelaide Zoo
 Perth Zoo
 David Fleay Wildlife Park
 Auckland Zoo

India 

 Nandankanan Zoological Park

Former

USA 

 World of Darkness, Bronx Zoo (New York) - closed 2009

References

External links
 Queensland Environmental Protection Agency
 Goodzoos.com

Zoos
Nocturnal animals